Ge is a genus of grass skipper butterflies in the family Hesperiidae described by Lionel de Nicéville in 1895. It is monotypic, containing the single species Ge geta, described in the same publication, and is found in Borneo, Sumatra, Nias, Batoe, Java, Burma, Thailand, Langkawi and Malaya.

References

Hesperiidae genus list. Butterflies and Moths of the World. Natural History Museum, London.
Ge de Nicéville, 1895 at Markku Savela's Lepidoptera and Some Other Life Forms

Hesperiinae
Hesperiidae genera